Global dimming is the reduction in the amount of global direct irradiance at the Earth's surface that has been observed since systematic measurements began in the 1950s. The effect varies by location, but worldwide it has been estimated to be of the order of a 4–20% reduction. However, after discounting an anomaly caused by the eruption of Mount Pinatubo in 1991, a very slight reversal in the overall trend has been observed.

Global dimming is thought to have been caused by an increase in particulates or aerosols, such as sulfate aerosols in the atmosphere due to human action. It has interfered with the hydrological cycle by reducing evaporation and may have reduced rainfall in some areas. Global dimming has been attributed as the leading factor in the 1984 Ethiopian famine by reducing heating at the tropics which drives the annual monsoon, or wet season.

Causes

It is thought that global dimming is probably due to the increased presence of aerosol particles in Earth's atmosphere, caused by pollution, dust, or volcanic eruptions.  Aerosols and other particulates absorb solar energy and reflect sunlight back into space. The pollutants can also become nuclei for cloud droplets. Water droplets in clouds coalesce around the particles.  Increased pollution causes more particulates and thereby creates clouds consisting of a greater number of smaller droplets (that is, the same amount of water is spread over more droplets). The smaller droplets make clouds more reflective, so that more incoming sunlight is reflected back into space and less reaches the Earth's surface. This same effect also reflects radiation from below, trapping it in the lower atmosphere. In models, these smaller droplets also decrease rainfall.

Clouds intercept both heat from the sun and heat radiated from the Earth. Their effects are complex and vary in time, location, and altitude. Usually during the daytime the interception of sunlight predominates, giving a cooling effect; however, at night the re-radiation of heat to the Earth slows the Earth's heat loss.

The incomplete combustion of fossil fuels (such as diesel) and wood releases black carbon into the air. Though black carbon, most of which is soot, is an extremely small component of air pollution at land surface levels, the phenomenon has a significant heating effect on the atmosphere at altitudes above two kilometers (6,562 ft). Also, it dims the surface of the ocean by absorbing solar radiation.

Experiments in the Maldives (comparing the atmosphere over the northern and southern islands) in the 1990s showed that the effect of macroscopic pollutants in the atmosphere at that time (blown south from India) caused about a 10% reduction in sunlight reaching the surface in the area under the Asian brown cloud – a much greater reduction than expected from the presence of the particles themselves.
Prior to the research being undertaken, predictions were of a 0.5–1% effect from particulate matter; the variation from prediction may be explained by cloud formation with the particles acting as the focus for droplet creation.

The phenomenon underlying global dimming may also have regional effects. While most of the earth has warmed, the regions that are downwind from major sources of air pollution (specifically sulfur dioxide emissions) have generally cooled. This may explain the cooling of the eastern United States relative to the warming western part.

However some research shows that black carbon will increase global warming, being second only to CO2. They believe that soot will absorb solar energy and transport it to other areas such as the Himalayas where glacial melting occurs. It can also darken Arctic ice reducing reflectivity and increasing absorption of solar radiation.

Airborne volcanic ash can reflect the Sun's rays back into space and thereby contribute to cooling the planet. Dips in earth temperatures have been observed after large volcano eruptions such as Mount Agung in Bali that erupted in 1963, El Chichon (Mexico) 1983, Ruiz (Colombia) 1985, and Pinatubo (Philippines) 1991. But even for major eruptions, the ash clouds remain only for relatively short periods.

Contrails and clouds
A study theorized that aircraft contrails (also called vapor trails) are implicated in regional cooling, but the constant flow of air traffic previously meant that this could not be tested. The near-total shutdown of civil air traffic during the three days following the September 11, 2001 attacks afforded a unique opportunity in which to observe the climate of the United States absent from the effect of contrails. During this period, an increase in diurnal temperature variation of 1.1 °C (1.8 °F) was observed in some parts of the U.S., i.e. aircraft contrails may have been raising nighttime temperatures and/or lowering daytime temperatures by much more than previously thought. However, a follow-up study attributed the temperature change to cloud cover. The authors wrote, "The variations in high cloud cover, including contrails and contrail-induced cirrus clouds, contribute weakly to the changes in the diurnal temperature range, which is governed primarily by lower altitude clouds, winds, and humidity."

Reversal

Wild et al., using measurements over land, report brightening since 1990, and Pinker et al. found that slight dimming continued over land while brightening occurred over the ocean.  Hence, over the land surface, Wild et al. and Pinker et al. disagree. A 2007 NASA sponsored satellite-based study sheds light on the puzzling observations by other scientists that the amount of sunlight reaching Earth's surface had been steadily declining in recent decades, began to reverse around 1990. This switch from a "global dimming" trend to a "brightening" trend happened just as global aerosol levels started to decline.

It is likely that at least some of this change, particularly over Europe, is due to decreases in airborne pollution. Most governments of developed nations have taken steps to reduce aerosols released into the atmosphere, which helps reduce global dimming.

Sulfate aerosols have declined significantly since 1970 with the Clean Air Act in the United States and similar policies in Europe. The Clean Air Act was strengthened in 1977 and 1990. According to the EPA, from 1970 to 2005, total emissions of the six principal air pollutants, including PM's, dropped by 53% in the US. In 1975, the masked effects of trapped greenhouse gases finally started to emerge and have dominated ever since.

The Baseline Surface Radiation Network (BSRN) has been collecting surface measurements. BSRN was started in the early 1990s and updated the archives in this time. Analysis of recent data reveals that the surface of the planet has brightened by about 4% in the past decade. The brightening trend is corroborated by other data, including satellite analyses.

Relationship to global warming
Some scientists now consider that the effects of global dimming have significantly masked the effect of global warming and that resolving global dimming may therefore lead to increases in future temperature rise.  According to Beate Liepert, "We lived in a global warming plus a global dimming world and now we are taking out global dimming. So we end up with the global warming world, which will be much worse than we thought it will be, much hotter."  The magnitude of this masking effect is one of the central problems in current climate change with significant implications for future climate changes and policy responses to global warming.

Interactions between the two theories for climate modification have also been studied, as global warming and global dimming are neither mutually exclusive nor contradictory. In a paper published on March 8, 2005, in the American Geophysical Union's Geophysical Research Letters, a research team led by Anastasia Romanou of Columbia University's Department of Applied Physics and Mathematics, New York, also showed that the apparently opposing forces of global warming and global dimming can occur at the same time. Global dimming interacts with global warming by blocking sunlight that would otherwise cause evaporation and the particulates bind to water droplets. Water vapor is the major greenhouse gas. On the other hand, global dimming is affected by evaporation and rain. Rain has the effect of clearing out polluted skies.

Brown clouds have been found to amplify global warming according to Veerabhadran Ramanathan, an atmospheric chemist at the Scripps Institution of Oceanography in La Jolla, California.  "The conventional thinking is that brown clouds have masked as much as 50 percent of global warming by greenhouse gases through so-called global dimming ... While this is true globally, this study reveals that over southern and eastern Asia, the soot particles in the brown clouds are in fact amplifying the atmospheric warming trend caused by greenhouse gases by as much as 50 percent."

Some scientists have suggested using aerosols to stave off the effects of global warming as an emergency geoengineering measure. In 1974, Mikhail Budyko suggested that if global warming became a problem, the planet could be cooled by burning sulfur in the stratosphere, which would create a haze.  An increase in planetary albedo of just 0.5 percent is sufficient to halve the effect of a CO2 doubling.

The simplest solution would be to simply emit more sulfates, which would end up in the troposphere – the lowest part of the atmosphere. If this were done, Earth would still face many problems, such as:
 Using sulfates causes environmental problems such as acid rain
 Using carbon black causes human health problems
 Dimming causes ecological problems such as changes in evaporation and rainfall patterns
 Droughts and/or increased rainfall cause problems for agriculture
 Aerosol has a relatively short lifetime

The solution advocated is transporting sulfates into the next higher layer of the atmosphere – stratosphere. Aerosols in the stratosphere last years instead of weeks – so only a relatively smaller (though still large) amount of sulfate emissions would be necessary, and side effects would be less. This would require developing an efficient way to transport large amounts of gases into stratosphere, many of which have been proposed though none are known to be effective or economically viable.

In a blog post, Gavin Schmidt stated that "Ideas that we should increase aerosol emissions to counteract global warming have been described as a 'Faustian bargain' because that would imply an ever increasing amount of emissions in order to match the accumulated greenhouse gas in the atmosphere, with ever increasing monetary and health costs."

Relationship to hydrological cycle

Pollution produced by humans may be seriously weakening the Earth's water cycle – reducing rainfall and threatening fresh water supplies. A 2001 study by researchers at the Scripps Institution of Oceanography suggests that tiny particles of soot and other pollutants have a significant effect on the hydrological cycle. According to Veerabhadran Ramanathan, "the energy for the hydrological cycle comes from sunlight. As sunlight heats the ocean, water escapes into the atmosphere and falls out as rain. So as aerosols cut down sunlight by large amounts, they may be spinning down the hydrological cycle of the planet."

Large scale changes in weather patterns may also have been caused by global dimming. Climate modelers speculatively suggest that this reduction in solar radiation at the surface may have led to the failure of the monsoon in sub-Saharan Africa during the 1970s and 1980s, together with the associated famines such as the Sahel drought, caused by Northern hemisphere pollution cooling the Atlantic.
Because of this, the Tropical rain belt may not have risen to its northern latitudes, thus causing an absence of seasonal rains. This claim is not universally accepted and is very difficult to test. However a 2009 Chinese study of 50 years of continuous data found that, though most parts of eastern China saw no significant change in the amount of water held by the atmosphere, light rains had decreased. The researchers then modeled the effect of aerosols and also concluded the overall effect was that water drops in polluted cases are up to 50 percent smaller than in pristine skies. They concluded smaller size impedes the formation of rain clouds, and the falling of light rain is beneficial for agriculture.  This was a different effect than reducing solar irradiance, but still a direct result from the presence of aerosols.

The 2001 study by researchers at the Scripps Institution of Oceanography concluded that the imbalance between global dimming and global warming at the surface leads to weaker turbulent heat fluxes to the atmosphere. This means globally reduced evaporation and hence precipitation occur in a dimmer and warmer world, which could ultimately lead to a more humid atmosphere in which it rains less.

A natural form of large scale environmental dimming effect on the development of tropical cyclones originates from Sahara desert dust, when the drifting sand and mineral particles laden air moves over the Atlantic Ocean. The particles reflect and absorb sunlight, less sun rays reach Earth surface layers, thus resulting in cooler water and land surface temperatures, and also less cloud formation, subsequently dampening the development of hurricanes.

Research

In the late-1960s, Mikhail Ivanovich Budyko worked with simple two-dimensional energy-balance climate models to investigate the reflectivity of ice. He found that the ice–albedo feedback created a positive feedback loop in the Earth's climate system. The more snow and ice, the more solar radiation is reflected back into space and hence the colder Earth grows and the more it snows. Other studies found that pollution or a volcano eruption could provoke the onset of an ice age.

In the 1980s, Atsumu Ohmura, a geography researcher at the Swiss Federal Institute of Technology, found that solar radiation striking the Earth's surface had declined by more than 10% over the three previous decades. His findings appeared to contradict global warming – the global temperature had been generally rising since the 70s. Less light reaching the earth seemed to mean that it should cool.  This was soon followed by others: Viivi Russak in 1990 "Trends of solar radiation, cloudiness and atmospheric transparency during recent decades in Estonia", and Beate Liepert in 1994 "Solar radiation in Germany – Observed trends and an assessment of their causes". Dimming has also been observed in sites all over the former Soviet Union. Gerry Stanhill who studied these declines worldwide in many papers coined the term "global dimming".

Independent research in Israel and the Netherlands in the late 1980s showed an apparent reduction in the amount of sunlight,  despite widespread evidence that the climate was becoming hotter. The rate of dimming varies around the world but is on average estimated at around 2–3% per decade. The trend reversed in the early 1990s. 
It is difficult to make a precise measurement, due to the difficulty in accurately calibrating the instruments used, and the problem of spatial coverage. Nonetheless, the effect is almost certainly present.

The effect (2–3%, as above) is due to changes within the Earth's atmosphere; the value of the solar radiation at the top of the atmosphere has not changed by more than a fraction of this amount.

The effect varies greatly over the planet, but estimates of the terrestrial surface average value are:
 5.3% (9 W/m2); over 1958–85 (Stanhill and Moreshet, 1992)
 2%/decade over 1964–93 (Gilgen et al., 1998)
 2.7%/decade (total 20 W/m2); up to 2000 (Stanhill and Cohen, 2001)
 4% over 1961–90 (Liepert 2002)

Note that these numbers are for the terrestrial surface and not really a global average. Whether dimming (or brightening) occurred over the ocean has been a bit of an unknown though a specific measurement measured effects some 400 miles (643.7 km) from India over the Indian Ocean towards the Maldives Islands. Regional effects probably dominate but are not strictly confined to the land area, and the effects will be driven by regional air circulation. A 2009 review by Wild et al. found that widespread variation in regional and time effects. There was solar brightening beyond 2000 at numerous stations in Europe, the United States, and Korea. The brightening seen at sites in Antarctica during the 1990s, influenced by recovering from the Mount Pinatubo volcanic eruption in 1991, fades after 2000. The brightening tendency also seems to level off at sites in Japan. In China there is some indication for a renewed dimming, after the stabilization in the 1990s. A continuation of the long-lasting dimming is also noted at the sites in India. Overall, the available data suggest continuation of the brightening beyond the year 2000 at numerous locations, yet less pronounced and coherent than during the 1990s, with more regions with no clear changes or declines. Therefore, globally, greenhouse warming after 2000 may be less modulated by surface solar variations than in prior decades. The largest reductions are found in the Northern Hemisphere mid-latitudes. Visible light and infrared radiation seem to be most affected rather than the ultraviolet part of the spectrum.

See also

 Anthropogenic cloud
 Asian brown cloud
 Chemtrail conspiracy theory
 Environmental impact of aviation
 Global cooling
Nuclear winter
 Ship tracks
 Snowball Earth
 Stratospheric aerosol injection
 Sunshine recorders

References

External links
 Global Aerosol Climatology Project

Climate change
Pollution
Air pollution